Lochans is a small village around  south of Stranraer, in Dumfries and Galloway in south-west Scotland. In 1971 it had a population of 355.

Areas of historic significance 
In the 19th century, Lochans Mill was a small two-storey range. The walls are made with stone rubble and the mill roofed with slate. In the late 1700s, this building was built as meal mill. The wheel at the side is made from cast iron and has six spokes mounted on a cast-iron axle; it is 3.66 m (12 ft) in diameter by 1.37m (4 ft) wide. Everything inside the mill has been removed, so there is no machinery. "Lochan" is the Gaelic word for a small loch.

Glaciology
Lochans are also used by a variety of scientists in the field of glaciology. Lochans are simply lakes, ponds or small concentrated rivers which are located on high rise glaciers or in open-wide plains. Not to be confused by tarns, kettle ponds, or truncated spurs, lochans are much more concentrated and use up a smaller area.

References

Villages in Dumfries and Galloway
Places in the Rhins